The Inderprastha Dental College & Hospital was incorporated under the aegis of the Kunj Behari Lal Charitable Trust. The college is affiliated with Atal Bihari Vajpayee Medical University, Lucknow.

Courses offered 
Inderprastha Dental College & Hospital offers course in Bachelor of Dental Surgery (B.D.S.). This is a 4-year course followed by 1 year of Internship.

The college also offers Master of Dental Surgery (MDS) course in the following specialties.
 Prosthodontics
 Conservative & Endodontics
 Orthodontics
 Periodontics
 Pedodontics

Infrastructure 
 100 Bedded General Hospital with 6 hour OPD
 300 Dental Chairs Out Patient Department (OPD) in 9 Specialties + costly VIP clinics facilities
 Separate Hostels for Boys & girls
Library

Patient care services 
 Treatments for dental diseases and problems

Regulatory approvals 
 Dental Council of India
 Ministry of Health & Family Welfare, Government of India
 Department of Health & Family Welfare, Government of Uttar Pradesh
 Atal Bihari Vajpayee Medical University, Lucknow

Awards 
 Best Dental College in India, 2018 awarded by Katalyst Research
 Best Private Dental College in India, 2015 awarded by Prime Time Media

Sister institutions 
The promoters of Kunj Behari Lal Charitable Trust are also associated with other institutes of repute:
 Inderprastha Engineering College
 Ajay Kumar Garg Engineering College is ranked as the best engineering college in the state of Uttar Pradesh by Uttar Pradesh Technical University (UPTU)
 IMS Group of Institutions

External links 
Inderprastha Dental College & Hospital

Dental colleges in India
Education in Ghaziabad, Uttar Pradesh
Educational institutions established in 2006
2006 establishments in Uttar Pradesh